OR47  may refer to:
 Strauch Field FAA LID
 Oregon Route 47, a road connecting the Willamette Valley, near McMinnville, and the city of Clatskanie, along the Columbia River in the northwest part of the state